The flag of Nashville, Tennessee, consists of the city's seal on a white disc surrounded by a field of blue, with a strip of gold on the fly. According to the resolution adopting the flag, the blue stands for the courage and conviction of the city's leaders throughout history, while the gold denotes the richness of city's land and resources. The flag was adopted in December 1963 when the governments of Nashville and Davidson County merged to form the Metro government. In an official ceremony, it was reigned in as the new flag on August 4, 1964, at the Metropolitan Courthouse. The flag is modeled after the Tennessee state flag.

History

The seal displays a Native American holding a skull standing by a tobacco plant, an eagle, and a badge-shaped shield decorated in a style similar to the American flag.  The Native is said to be a representative of the "Woodland" culture contemplating the skull of a member of an earlier Native culture such as the Mound Builders. Though the de jure version of the flag included a monochromatic seal, today flags in Nashville are displayed with the seal in full color. Additionally, there is usually a thin white bar separating the outer strip of yellow from the blue field.

Prior to the consolidation, the flag consisted of a blue star on a red background overlapped by two crossing white bars. The blue star was enclosed in golden olive branches located under the letter N, standing for the city name. It had been designed by Harville H. Duncan and adopted by the City Council in 1961.

In a review by the North American Vexillological Association of 150 U.S. city flags, the Nashvillian flag came in 43rd with a rating of 4.85 out of 10. The group cited Nashville's use of its city seal, which they said makes flags difficult to discern from a distance. They also stated that the gold outer stripe would not have much functionality, because flags tend to fray, and the outer edge occasionally needs shaving. Mayor Bill Purcell commented, "Flags are a subjective thing. People in the rest of the country may not appreciate our unique flag. It's a flag that takes some time to get comfortable with. There are not many flags with a skull on it."

References

Flags of the World's entry on the Nashville flag
Mayor Bill Purcell hands the Metro flag to a school principal
A page by the Tennessee Daughters of the American Revolution on the Metro Nashville flag
 Devereaux D. Cannon, Jr. (1990). Flags of Tennessee. Pelican. 

Nashville, Tennessee
Nashville, Tennessee
Nashville
1963 establishments in Tennessee